Al-Khayzuran bint Atta (died 789) was the wife of the Abbasid Caliph Al-Mahdi and mother of both Caliphs Al-Hadi and Harun al-Rashid. She ruled de facto from 775 to 789 during the reign of her husband and sons and is known for her immense influence on state affairs.

While not formally a ruler, al-Khayzuran was nevertheless the first woman in the history of Islam to rule de facto and was the first woman in the history of Muslims to have gold coins in her name. She became one of the most powerful women of her time under the name of her husband and sons, al-Mahdi, al-Hadi and al-Harun. During the reign of al-Mahdi, al-Khayzuran often appeared at the court when the caliph was present and also used great political power, and caliph sought her views on most matters before issuing orders.

Al-Khayzuran was also the first woman to have her own bureaucracy and court and accept petitions and the audience of officials and the people, and to command and forbid in the caliphate. Independent of the state treasury, she gained enormous wealth by having extensive trade relations with other countries. While al-Mahdi spent most of his time hunting and having fun, she, by influencing the court, was able to hold meetings in her house to run the caliphate. Even after his death, she continued to wield premiere power and influence during her sons' time.

At the time of al-Mahdi's untimely death, al-Khayzuran in the capital (Baghdad) had already taken over government affairs and by hiding his death and paying the salaries of army officers, she secured the allegiance of the soldiers for her son al-Hadi as the new caliph. but al-Hadi opposed his mother in sharing and partnership unquestionable power in the caliphate, and al-Khayzuran killed him after severe disputes. She brought Harun al-Rashid to power. Unlike his brother, al-Harun did not oppose his mother and officially handed over all power to his mother and relied upon his mother's advice.

Life
Al-Khayzuran was from Jorash, near modern Bisha, Saudi Arabia. She was kidnapped from her home by a Bedouin who then sold her in a slave market near Mecca to Al-Mahdi during his pilgrimage. Officially it was not legal for Muslims to enslave Muslims, however all sources are nevertheless adamant that she was a slave, and to break the official rule of the enslavement of Muslims does seem not to have been unusual in practice in these context.

Reign of Al-Mahdi 

Al-Khayzuran was described as beautiful, intelligent and gifted: at that time, the woman slaves or Jawaris of the harem were famed for educating themselves in music, singing, astrology, mathematics and theology in order to keep their master's interest, and Al-Khayzuran took regular lessons in fiqh by the most learned qadis.  
She eventually became the favorite concubine of Al-Mahdi, called jarya or jawari. Upon his succession as Caliph in 775, she managed to convince him to free her and marry her, depriving his first spouse, princess Rayta, daughter of Caliph Al-Saffah, of her privileges: she also convinced him to deprive his son in his first marriage from the position of heir to the throne, and instead name her sons as heirs, despite the fact that the custom at that time did not allow for the sons of a slave to be named heirs. From that point on, she was the most powerful and influential woman in the court, and whenever the caliph went to court, she accompanied him. Al-Khayzuran would sit behind a screen behind him to hear the reports. She could always talk directly with the caliph for hours at a time, and her suggestions were always adopted. At her intercession, he forgave enemies or commuted death sentences; Individuals she recommended would be favored and promoted by the caliph.

At the court, she was an ally of the Barmakids. During the reign of her spouse, Al-Khayzuran raised to an unusual position for a woman; she discussed and helped decide all military and state affairs, and she was not secluded in the harem, Al-Mahdi allowed her to sit on a separate tribunalvand held audiences with generals, politicians and officials in her chambers, mixing with men and discussing state affairs and to command and forbid in any matter of her own free will. Her palace, like the caliph's palace, was guarded by soldiers, and her lands spread past the outskirts of the capital , and she owned hundreds of slaves and had many female attendants, her annual income was one-third of the caliphate's annual income, which, of course, doubled during the caliphate of her sons, the caliphs Al-Hadi and Harun al-Rashid, and accounted for more than half of the caliphate's income. She lived a luxurious life. Al-Mahdi also allowed her to meet with foreign ambassadors and even sign official papers for the administration of the empire. All these measures are an innovation considered culturally inappropriate for a woman and one that emphasized her influential and powerful position in the empire. She recalled her mother, two sisters and two brothers to court, married her sister Salsal to prince Ja'far and named her brother Ghatrif governor of Yemen.

Except their two sons, the couple also had a daughter, Banuqa, who her father loved so much that he dressed her up as a boy to be able to bring with him during his travels: when she died at age 16, her father made a scandal by demanding public condolences, which was not seen correct for a daughter.

One time when Khaizuran was in her flat encircled by other imperial women, a servant notificed her that Muznah, the widow of Marwan II, the last Umayyad caliph, was at the door. Muznah was impoverished and her story and situation moved Khaizuran's heart so much that she arranged for her to be provided for. When Khaizuran and Mahdi had dinner together that evening, she notified him what had happened. Mahdi praised her charity, and Muznah enjoyed royal patronage until her death in subsequent reign.

Reign of Al-Hadi 
In 785, Al-Mahdi died during an expedition with his son Harun, who rushed back to Baghdad to inform her. Her two sons were also absent from the city, and to secure the succession for her son, she called upon the viziers and ordered them to pay the wages of the army to secure order, and then had them swear allegiance to her son as their new Caliph in his absence.

Al-Khayzuran reportedly wished to continue to engage in politics during the reign of her son: "Khayzuran wanted to dominate her son as she had previously dominated his father, al-Mahdi."
She continued to give audiences in her chambers and discuss state affairs during the reign of her son Al-Hadi: 
"She continued to monopolize decision-making without consulting him [al-Hadi], Khayzuran in the first part of Hadi’s reign used to settle his affairs and to deal with him as she had dealt with his father before him in assuming absolute power to command and forbid. She in the first part of Hadi’s reign, behaved as she had before.... . During the reign of al-Mahdi people came and went through her door, and she settled the affairs of the state."

Al-Hadi, however, opposed her participation in state affairs, and he was not inclined to allow displays of authority by her and attempted to exclude her from them, reportedly saying: "it is not in the power of women to intervene .. . in matters of sovereignty. Look to your prayers and your prayer beads."
He disapproved of the fact that his mother gave audiences to supplicants, politicians, officials and generals and conferred with them and thus mixed with men, which he considered improper, and he publicly addressed the issue of his mothers public life by assembling his generals and asked them: 
'Who is the better among us, you or me?' asked Caliph al-Hadi of his audience. 
'Obviously you are the better, Commander of the Faithful,' the assembly replied.
'And whose mother is the better, mine or yours?' continued the caliph.
'Your mother is the better, Commander of the Faithful.'
'Who among you', continued al-Hadi, 'would like to have men spreading news about your mother?'
'No one likes to have his mother talked about,' responded those present.
'Then why do men go to my mother to speak to her?'
Until this time period, Muslim women had not yet been fully secluded from society in a harem, but harem system was to become fully institutionalized in the Islamic world under the Abbasid caliphate, when the Abbasid harem was established.

Despite his opposition, Al-Hadi did not manage to disturb his mother's extraordinary authority base, and she refused to retire from politics into the harem. The conflict was finally exposed in public when she interceded in favor of a supplicant, Abdallah ibn Malik, and publicly demanded a reply from her son, who lost his temper and openly yelled at her and said: 
"Wait a moment and listen well to my words ... . Whoever from among my entourage - my generals, my servants - comes to you with a petition will have his head cut off and his property confiscated. What is the meaning of those retinues that throng around your door every day? Don't you have a spindle to keep you busy, a Koran for praying, a residence in which to hide from those besieging you? Watch yourself, and woe to you if you open your mouth in favour of anyone at all."

Al-Khayzuran is rumored to have had her eldest son Al-Hadi murdered after this incident. One reason given is that she learned that he was planning to kill his brother Harun al-Rashid, another that he attempted to poison her himself, which she discovered after first allowing her dog to eat of the dish he had sent to her. One version claims that she gave the task of killing him to one of his slave concubines, or jawari, to suffocate him with cushions.

Reign of Harun al-Rashid 
Her second son, caliph Harun al-Rashid, in contrast to his brother, did not oppose to his mother participating in the affairs of state, but instead openly acknowledged her political ability and publicly trusted her advice, and governed the realm by her side. He was proud to point out that there was no reason for him to be ashamed of sharing his power with a woman, if she had such ability and brilliance as Al-Khayzuran.

Though it is difficult to say exactly in which issues she pressed her policy, it is nevertheless acknowledged that she participated in the decision making that formed the policy of the Caliphate. And at this time Al-Khayzuran retained all the powers of the empire and actually ruled instead of the caliph. She also legitimized her full-scale authority over her son by an old and popular saying "a mother's right is God's right".

"The histories do not detail Khayzuran's political achievements, but coins were struck in her name, palaces were named for her, and the cemetery in which subsequent Abbasid rulers were laid to rest carries her name, all testifying not only to status but also to civic largesse."

When she died in 789, her son broke the rules which demanded that he show no sorrow, and instead publicly demonstrated his sorrow and participated in her funeral, which attracted much attention.

Family
Al-Khayzuran bint Atta was contemporary to three powerful caliphs; al-Mahdi, al-Hadi, al-Rashid. In her parental home she had a brother named Ghitrif ibn Atta, two daughters of Ghitrif; Ubaidah and Azizah married Al-Khayzuran two son Musa and Harun respectively. Thus her two nieces became his Daughter-in-laws too.

Legacy
Al-Khayzuran and her strong personality is believed by many literary historians to be a key influence on Scheherazade, the main character in One Thousand and One Nights. Many of the stories were influenced by Harun al-Rashid and his fabulous court.

See also
 Lubana bint Ali ibn al-Mahdi, was the wife of Abbasid Caliph Muhammad al-Amin.
 Umm Isa, Abbasid princess.

References

Bibliography
 Ibn Kathir, Al Bidayah wa al-Nihayah
 Al-Thahbi, Sirat Alam al-nubala
 Al-Zarkali, Al-Alam
 Ahmad Khalil Juma, Nesaa min al-tarikh
 Verde, Tom. 2016. "Malik I: Khayzuran & Zubayda". Saudi Aramco World. January–February 2016. Vol. 67, no. 1, pages 42–45.
 Zaynab Husayan, Majaam Alam ak-nesaa

8th-century Arabs
8th-century births
8th-century women from the Abbasid Caliphate
789 deaths
Arab Muslims
Wives of Abbasid caliphs
Arabian slaves and freedmen
Medieval slaves
Mothers of Abbasid caliphs
Harun al-Rashid